Henley & Partners is an investment migration consultancy based in London. The company also advises governments on residence and citizenship-by-investment policy and works with them to develop and implement residence and citizenship programs. It also consults on general immigration law and policy as well as visa policy and the negotiation of associated treaties. The company's Residence and Citizenship Practice Group advises individuals and their advisors such as law firms, banks, and family offices on alternative residence and citizenship. According to The Guardian, it "arguably invented the modern 'citizenship planning' industry". Led by Christian Kälin, the firm is, as of 2020, the world's largest investment migration consultancy.

It has been criticised for its core business model, which detractors believe to threaten the fight against cross-border corruption and crime, which the company dismissed. Henley's immigrant investor programs in Malta and in St. Kitts and Nevis have stirred controversy, despite economic benefits to both the countries.

History 

Originally founded in the 1970s, Henley & Partners was re-formed in 1997 through the combination of a private client immigration consultancy and a corporate and family services company. In the late 1990s and through the 2000s, the firm advised wealthy businesspeople and individuals move their businesses and families around the world, largely through the acquisition of residence and citizenship from Austria, Canada, Hong Kong, US, Switzerland, and St. Kitts and Nevis. At the time, the concept of residence and citizenship planning was relatively new and not considered to be of much relevance. This situation changed in 2006, however, when the firm became involved in the restructuring of St. Kitts and Nevis's citizenship-by-investment program, incorporating donations to support the country's transition to tourism and services following the closure of the sugar industry in 2005.

Following the restructuring of the St. Kitts and Nevis citizenship program, Henley & Partners began to advise the governments of Antigua and Barbuda, Grenada, and Cyprus on how to develop their own investment migration programs, and has since that time worked for and been mandated by several other governments. In 2012, Reuters wrote that Henley & Partners is “at the center of the citizenship by investment movement”.

St. Kitts and Nevis 
In 2006, the firm restructured St. Kitts and Nevis's citizenship-by-investment program, and obtained exclusive rights to market St. Kitts & Nevis worldwide. The company gave the country's government a $20,000 fee for every successful applicant for its passport program. Applicants for passports could either invest in real state on the islands or donate to the Sugar Industry Diversification Foundation (SIDF), a bank-owned investment vehicle set up in 2006 to invest on behalf of the St. Kitts and Nevis population. The contract between Henley and Partners and St. Kitts and Nevis ended in 2013.

In 2014, the US and Canada flagged that St. Kitts and Nevis was allowing financial criminals and individuals evading sanctions to obtain passports through the program. Canada ended its visa-free agreement with St. Kitts and Nevis.

Observers have had persistent concerns about the lack of transparency about SIDF, which was set up by Henley and Partners. The IMF said in 2014 that the SIDF needs to make "substantial improvement in its reporting to enhance the transparency of its operations." The U.S. State Department said in 2017 that there was a "lack of financial oversight" of the SIDF. Transparency International said it was unclear whether the SIDF used its money to benefit the St. Kitts and Nevis population.

It was later revealed that the SIDF's investments had failed. SIDF invested its money into a failed resort business and a company owned by a Henley associate with ties to chairman Christian Kälin. In 2017, the St Kitts and Nevis government stopped allowing passport applicants to pay into the SIDF.

According to 2022 reporting by the OCCRP, there is evidence that Henley CEO Christian Kälin helped to finance the successful 2010 re-election campaign of Denzil Douglas, the St. Kitts and Nevis prime minister. At the same time, Henley entered into at least three agreements with the SCL Group or its affiliated companies to help each other in the Caribbean region. Henley has denied financing the Douglas campaign. However, Douglas stated in an unpublished 2018 interview that Henley did fund his campaign and that the SCL Group was hired to manage the campaign. Henley responded by calling Douglas a liar.

Malta 
In 2013, Henley & Partners participated in a public tender and won the right to design and globally promote Malta's citizenship-by-investment program, the Malta Individual Investor Programme, which raised over $1 billion within 18 months of its launch. Arton Capital, a competing firm, filed a judicial protest, appealing the decision to award the contract to its competitor, claiming that Henley & Partners provided consultation to the government on a similar program before. Arton Capital settled out of court in 2015.

The program provides citizenship to foreign individuals and their families who are believed to contribute to the country's economic development. The country later introduced more stringent conditions for acquiring citizenship, such as proof of residence in Malta for at least 12 months.

The launch of the Malta Individual Investor Programme in 2014 drew criticism from opposition officials, who claimed the program could open a back door into Europe for criminals. It was reported at the time that officials believed the screening process would be compromised because Malta had outsourced the vetting of citizenship applicants to a single company.

Jho Low, a businessman involved in the 1Malaysia Development Berhad scandal and international fugitive, was believed to be a client of Henley & Partners. Media reported that Low obtained a Cypriot passport by investing €5 million in a transaction facilitated by the firm. Henley & Partners denied these allegations, asserting that Low was never a client and was specifically rejected as such in 2015. Leaked documents in 2021 revealed that Henley referred Low to a third-party agency in Cyprus. Henley received €710,000 indirectly as a result of a subsequent real estate transaction involving Low.

In 2021, thousands of the firm's emails and documents were leaked. It revealed how some applicants to the Maltese scheme claimed to be resident of the country by renting apartments but leaving them unoccupied. In an undercover video shot as part of the coverage following the leaks, an employee of the firm advised prospective applicants to only "do the bare minimum" in satisfying the scheme's criteria. The documents also showed that Henley & Partners knew of government's plans to launch a citizenship-by-investment programme two months before the public tender for a company to operate it was announced. As the European Union had clashed with the Maltese government over the programme before, the leaks were seen as strengthening the EU's case against it.

Publications 

Henley & Partners publishes books and reports. Publications include the Henley Passport Index, the Quality of Nationality Index, the Henley Residence Index, the Henley Citizenship Index, the Henley Wealth Migration Dashboard, the Africa Wealth Report, the Global Mobility Report, the Global Citizens Report and the Best Investment Migration Real Estate Index.

In March 2021, the company published the Investment Migration Programs Health Risk Assessment Report, which analyzed the stability of 31 countries with investment migration programs, in the context of the COVID-19 pandemic.
The Africa Wealth Report is an annual report which lists private wealth in the African continent. The 2022 report was released by the company in collaboration with New World Wealth.
The Henley Passport Index is an annual ranking of countries in the world based on how many travel destinations are accessible to the passport holders without a prior visa.
The Investment Migration Climate Resilience Index by the company assesses a country's climate resilience and ranks climate resilient locations for migration. The 2022 report evaluated 180 countries based on five parameters of 900 data points.
The Global Citizens Report is a report by the company which analyses the private wealth and investment migration trends worldwide.

Conferences 

Since 2006, the company hosts an annual Global Citizenship Conference.

Philanthropy 

In 2015, Henley & Partners formed a multi-year partnership with the United Nations High Commissioner for Refugees (UNHCR) which entailed a US$1 million donation by the firm. As part of the partnership, also raises awareness for the refugee cause. The firm has also developed the annual Global Citizen Award, which consists of a $50,000 monetary prize to individuals "improving the global community". In 2017, the firm supported the establishment of the Andan Foundation, a Switzerland-based refugee nonprofit.

Memberships 
Henley & Partners is a 2014 founding member of the Investment Migration Council, a non-profit association for investor immigration and citizenship-by-investment.

References

External links 

Consulting firms established in 1997